is a former Japanese football player. He played for Japan national team.

Club career
Yoshihara was born in Fujiidera on February 2, 1978. After graduating from high school, he joined Japan Football League club Consadole Sapporo in 1996. The club won the champions in 1997 and was promoted to J1 League. However the club was relegated to new league J2 League in 1999. He moved to his local club Gamba Osaka in 2000. Although he became a regular player from 2001, his opportunity to play decreased from 2003. He moved to Omiya Ardija in 2006. He moved to Mito HollyHock in 2009. He made an announcement to retire on 2 February 2013, on his 35th birthday.

National team career
In June 1999, Yoshihara was selected Japan national team for 1999 Copa América. At this competition, on July 2, he debuted against Paraguay.

Club statistics

National team statistics

References

External links

 
 Japan National Football Team Database
 
 

1978 births
Living people
Association football people from Osaka Prefecture
Japanese footballers
J1 League players
J2 League players
Japan Football League (1992–1998) players
Hokkaido Consadole Sapporo players
Gamba Osaka players
Omiya Ardija players
Mito HollyHock players
Japan international footballers
1999 Copa América players
Association football forwards
People from Fujiidera, Osaka